The Portsmouth Compact was a document signed on March 7, 1638 that established the settlement of Portsmouth, which is now a town in the state of Rhode Island. It was the first document in American history that severed both political and religious ties with England.

History
The document was written and signed by a group of Christian dissidents who were seeking religious freedom from the governmental oversight of the Massachusetts Bay Colony by moving to Aquidneck Island to set up a new colony. Among this group was Anne Hutchinson, who had been banished from Massachusetts Bay following the Antinomian Controversy there. 

The purpose of the Portsmouth Compact was to set up a new, independent colony that was Christian in character but non-sectarian in governance.  It has been called "the first instrument for governing as a true democracy."

Text
The text of the Portsmouth Compact:

The 7th Day of the First Month, 1638.
We whose names are underwritten do hereby solemnly in the presence of Jehovah incorporate ourselves into a Bodie Politick and as He shall help, will submit our persons, lives and estates unto our Lord Jesus Christ, the King of Kings, and Lord of Lords, and to all those perfect and most absolute laws of His given in His Holy Word of truth, to be guided and judged thereby. 

In the margin are the following Bible citations: 

It was signed by 23 men:
William Coddington
John Clarke 
William Hutchinson (husband of Anne Hutchinson)
John Coggeshall 
William Aspinwall 
Samuel Wilbore 
John Porter
John Sanford
Edward Hutchinson, Jr.
Thomas Savage 
William Dyre (husband of Mary Dyer)
William Freeborn 
Phillip Shearman 
John Walker 
Richard Carder 
William Baulston 
Edward Hutchinson, Sr.
Henry Bull X his marke
Randall Holden 
Thomas Clarke (brother of John)
John Johnson
William Hall
John Brightman

The last four names show erasure marks or strikethroughs for unknown reasons: Thomas Clarke, John Johnson, William Hall, and John Brightman. The first three of those four were among the first settlers of Newport, arriving in 1638, and the same may be true of John Brightman. William Hall's name may erasure marks due to his disagreement with Portsmouth authorities soon after the towns establishment. Hall is said to have stated, "A pastor is not needed to figure out one's religion as I can read the bible for myself" and "one's deeds and action ye are known in Heaven."

Compact of Loyalty

The Compact of Loyalty [4] was written and signed April 30, 1639.

"We whose names are underwritten do acknowledge ourselves the legal subjects of His Majesty King Charles, and in his name do hereby bind ourselves into a civil body politic, unto his laws according to matters of justice."

Signatories
William Hutchinson
Samuell Gorton
Samuel Hutchinson
John Wickes
Richard Maggson
Thomas Spiser
John Roome (his mark)
John Sloffe (his mark)
Thomas Beddar (his mark)
Erasmus Bullock
Sampson Shotten
Ralph Earle
Robert Potter
Nathanyell Potter
Wm Heausens
George Cleare
George Lawton
Anthony Payne (his mark)
Jobe Haukins
Richard Awards
John More
Nicholas Browne
William Richardson
John Trippe
Thomas Layton
Robert Stainton (his mark)
John Briggs (his mark)
James Davice

The names of the signatories above were copied verbatim from the Compact of Loyalty.  Note that the only name in common with the signatories of the Portsmouth compact is that of William Hutchinson.

Sources
[1] The Portsmouth Compact at Roots Web
[2] Image of the Original Portsmouth Compact
[3] Company of Loyalty
[4] A Brief History of Portsmouth RI 1638-2013

External links
Facsimile at Roots Web
Commemorative Plaque

P
P
P
1638 in the Thirteen Colonies